Giuseppe Maria Foppa (Venice, 12 July 1760 – Venice, 1 March 1845) was an Italian librettist. He wrote around 150 libretti, mainly for comic operas, as well as Latin oratorio texts and his memoirs.

Librettos
Romeo and Juliet, for Nicola Antonio Zingarelli
L'inganno felice, La scala di seta, Il signor Bruschino and Sigismondo (1814) for Gioachino Rossini
Gli artigiani, 1795 for Pasquale Anfossi
L'intrigo della lettera 1797, and several oratorios for Simone Mayr 
Lo spazzacamino principe 1794, and  Le donne cambiate  1797 for Marcos António Portugal 
Teresa e Claudio, 1801 for Giuseppe Farinelli
Le metamorfosi di Pasquale, 1802 for Gaspare Spontini
Un buco nella porta, 1804 for Francesco Gardi

References

18th-century Venetian writers
1760 births
1845 deaths
Italian librettists